Pawala Valley Ridge, is the highest point of the Pitcairn Islands, a British overseas territory in the Pacific Ocean, with an elevation of 347 metres (1,138 ft).

See also
 Geography of the Pitcairn Islands

External links
  Pawala Valley Ridge, Pitcairn Island, Peakbagger.com.

Pawala Valley Ridge
Landforms of Oceania
Ridges